The 2012 World Junior Ice Hockey Championship Division II was played in two groups of six teams each. In each group the first-placed team is promoted to a higher level, while the last-placed team is relegated to a lower level. This year, for the first time, the winner of Group B is promoted to Group A and the winner of Group A is promoted to the next year's Division I. Previously the winners of both groups were promoted to the Division I.

Division II A
The Division II A tournament was played in Donetsk, Ukraine, from 12 to 18 December 2011.

Participants

Final standings

Results
All times are local. (Eastern European Time – UTC+2)

Statistics

Top 10 scorers

Goaltending leaders
(minimum 40% team's total ice time)

IIHF Best Players awards

 Goaltender:  Mantas Armalis
 Defenceman:  Valentyn Sirchenko
 Forward:  Viktor Zakharov

Division II B
The Division II B tournament was played in Tallinn, Estonia, from 10 to 16 December 2011.

Participants

Final standings

Results
All times are local. (Eastern European Time – UTC+2)

Statistics

Top 10 scorers

Goaltending leaders
(minimum 40% team's total ice time)

IIHF Best Players awards

 Goaltender:  Jovan Feher
 Defenceman:  Ken Kuusk
 Forward:  Roberto Gliga

References

External links
IIHF.com

World Junior Ice Hockey Championships - Division I, 2012
II
World Junior Ice Hockey Championships – Division II
International ice hockey competitions hosted by Estonia
International ice hockey competitions hosted by Ukraine
2011–12 in Estonian ice hockey
2012 in Ukrainian sport